The Danish ironclad Peder Skram was originally laid down as a wooden steam frigate for the Royal Danish Navy, but was converted to an armored frigate while under construction in the early 1860s. She had an uneventful career before she was stricken from the Navy List on 7 December 1885. The ship was converted into an accommodation ship that year and was broken up in 1897.

Description
The ship displaced . She had a single steam engine that drove her propeller using steam provided by four boilers that exhausted through a single funnel. For long-distance travel, Peder Skram was fitted with three masts and ship rigged. Her crew numbered between 450 and 530 officers and crewmen.

The ship was armed with six  and twelve 24- or 26-pounder rifled muzzle-loading (RML) guns. She was later rearmed with eight 8-inch and eight   RML guns. Her battery was protected by  armor plates.

Construction and career
Peder Skram was built by the Royal shipyard in Copenhagen. She was laid down as a wooden steam frigate on 19 May 1859 and was converted into armored frigate in 1862 while still under construction. She was launched on 18 October 1864 and commissioned on 15 August 1866. The ship was refitted in 1876–78 and stricken on 7 December 1885. Peder Skram was hulked and converted into an accommodation ship until she was broken up for scrap in 1897.

Notes

References
 

Frigates of the Royal Danish Navy
1864 ships
Ironclad warships of the Royal Danish Navy
Ships built in Copenhagen